is a railway station in Naka-ku, Nagoya, Aichi Prefecture,  Japan, operated by Meitetsu.

Lines

Station layout
The station has two underground opposed side platforms. The station has automated ticket machines, Manaca automated turnstiles and is staffed.

Platforms

Adjacent stations

|-
!colspan=5|Nagoya Railroad

Station history
Higashi Ōte Station was opened on October 1, 1910, but was closed in 1944. The station was reopened as an underground station on August 20, 1978 with the extension of the Seto Line to Sakaemachi Station. On December 16, 2006, the Tranpass system of magnetic fare cards with automatic turnstiles was implemented.

Passenger statistics
In fiscal 2017, the station was used by an average of 1846 passengers daily.

Surrounding area
 Nagoya Castle
Aichi Prefectural Assembly
Nagoya City Hall
Aichi Prefectural Meiwa High School
Nagoya Medical Center
Nagoya City Archives

See also
 List of Railway Stations in Japan

References

External links

 Official web page 

Railway stations in Japan opened in 1910
Railway stations in Aichi Prefecture
Stations of Nagoya Railroad
Railway stations in Nagoya